Cosijoeza, Cocijoeza o Cosiioeza (Zapotec: Gzio'za'a or Kosi'ioeza) (1450–1504) was a Coquitao (King in Zapotec) of Zaachila (the kingdom not to be confused with the homonymous city), its name in Zapotec means "Storm of obsidian knives" or "time of obsidian knives", was named by Aztecs as Huizquiauitl. He ascended the throne in 1487, faced the expansionism of the Aztec Empire and built the city of Guiengola.

The geostrategic importance of the kingdom of Zaachila  is due to its condition as a bridge between the highlands of the Anáhuac center and the Mayan lands of what is now Chiapas and Guatemala, as well as its important salt production industry on the coast, goldsmith and grana cochineal (these activities continue to be industries in the region although with less economic influence than in the past) because of this Zaachila was seen under the ambition of the Aztecs.

In the face of the threat posed by the Aztecs, in 1494 King Cosiioeza ordered the killing of the children who were in his territory for being the spies, the Aztec Tlatoani Ahuitzotl took these murders as casus belli and in 1497 the war began. Zapotec, the city of Huaxyacac was the first to be attacked and destroyed, then it was Mitla, the military campaign spread through the Isthmus of Tehuantepec and reach the Soconusco, this led to Cosiíoeza to propose an alliance to the Mixtec king Dzahuindanda, Dzahuindanda accepted this alliance and supplied 24,000 warriors that joined the 36,000 of Zaachila's army, together they succeeded in expelling the Aztecs.

In 1497 Ahuitzotl again attacked the Zapotec and Mixteca allied kingdoms and sent the general command army Tlacatecat to the bastion that represented Guiengola, the siege of the city lasted 7 months. Ahuitzotl then proposed a peace treaty to Cosiíoeza in which he included the hand of his daughter, the princess Xilabela. From this union, princes Cosiiopii II and Pinopiaa were born.

At his death Cosiíoeza was buried in the city of Zaachila, capital of the homonymous kingdom, a place where it was customary to bury the Zapotec sovereigns.

References 

1450 births
Zapotec people
1504 deaths